Hunts Green is a hamlet in Berkshire, England, and part of the civil parish of Boxford.

Hamlets in Berkshire
West Berkshire District